Gnathium minimum is a species of blister beetle in the family Meloidae. It is found in Central America and North America.

References

Further reading

External links

 

Meloidae
Articles created by Qbugbot
Beetles described in 1823